Bandura is a surname. Notable people with the name include:

 Albert Bandura (1925–2021), Canadian-American psychologist
 Eddy Bandura (1940–2018), German footballer 
 Jeff Bandura (born 1957), Canadian ice hockey defenceman
 Oleksandr Bandura (born 1986), Ukrainian football goalkeeper
 Oleksandra Bandura (1917–2010), Ukrainian teacher and literature scholar